Sultan Omar Riayat Shah ibni Almarhum Sultan Ahmad Muazzam Shah I, also known as Baginda Omar, was both the 6th and 9th Sultan of Terengganu, having ascended to the throne twice, first in 1831 and again from 1839 to 1876. Baginda means "the Fortunate" but in its actual use in Malay history is better translated as "the Conqueror".

Baginda Omar was born in 1806. He first ascended to become joint Sultan of Terengganu with Sultan Mansur Shah II. However this joint rule would last less than one year before he was overthrown by Mansur Shah II. In 1833, he was banished to Daik by Mansur II.

He again rose to power in 1839 by overthrowing his cousin Sultan Muhammad. He supported Mahmud Muzaffar Shah in his attempt to take control of Pahang.

Istana Hijau, Terengganu's royal palace, was constructed during his reign on 10 March 1870. The palace was burnt down in a fire and was later replaced by Istana Maziah.

References

Further reading 
 Article on seals of Malay rulers
 Encyclopædia Britannica. 15th Edition (1982), Vol. VI, p. 504.
 Sejarah Darul Iman: by Dato Setia Jasa Mohd Salleh Awang (Misbaha)

Sultans of Terengganu
1806 births
1876 deaths
19th-century monarchs in Asia
Monarchs who abdicated